Emad El Geziry (born 14 November 1981) is an Egyptian modern pentathlete. At age 18, he competed at the 2000 Summer Olympics. His brothers, Omar and Amro, are also Olympic pentathletes.

References

External links
 

1981 births
Living people
Egyptian male modern pentathletes
Olympic modern pentathletes of Egypt
Modern pentathletes at the 2000 Summer Olympics
Sportspeople from Cairo
20th-century Egyptian people
21st-century Egyptian people